is a UK company law case concerning piercing the corporate veil.

Facts
Mr Smallbone had been the managing director of Trustor AB, and it was claimed that in breach of fiduciary duty he transferred money to a company that he owned and controlled. Trustor AB applied to treat receipt of the assets of that company as the same as the assets of Mr Smallbone. It argued that Smallbone's company was a sham to help breaches of duty, it had been involved in improper acts and the interests of justice demanded the result. The case against Mr Smallbone was eventually dropped by Trustor AB as there was no breach of fiduciary duty.

Judgment
Sir Andrew Morritt VC held that there was enough evidence to lift the veil on the basis that it was a "mere facade". He noted the tension between Adams v Cape Industries plc and later cases and stated that impropriety is not enough to pierce the veil, but the court is entitled to do so where a company is used ‘as a device or façade to conceal the true facts and the liability of the responsible individuals.’

See also

UK company law
Lifting the corporate veil

Notes

References

United Kingdom company case law
United Kingdom corporate personality case law
High Court of Justice cases
2001 in British law
2001 in case law